Daniele Bracciali and Potito Starace were the defending champions, but they decided not to participate this year.

Guido Andreozzi and Guillermo Durán won the title, defeating Lee Hsin-han and Alessandro Motti in the final, 6–3, 6–2.

Seeds

Draw

References
 Main Draw

Citta di Caltanissetta - Doubles
2015 Doubles